L'Atlantide may refer to:

 L'Atlantide, also known as Atlantida, a 1919 novel by Pierre Benoit
 L'Atlantide (opera), an opera by Henri Tomasi first produced in 1959 at the Paris Opera
 L'Atlantide, the French name for the legendary island of Atlantis

Film 
 L'Atlantide (1921 film), a 1921 film directed by Jacques Feyder
 L'Atlantide (1932 film), a 1932 film directed by G. W. Pabst
 Journey Beneath the Desert (L'Atlantide), a 1961 film directed by Giuseppe Masini and Edgar G. Ulmer
 L'Atlantide (1992 film), a 1992 film directed by Bob Swaim